Ilija Stolica (born 7 July 1978) is a Serbian football manager and former player.

Club career
Due to his promising performances at Zemun, Stolica earned a transfer to Spanish club Lleida in 1998. He played one season in Spain's second division, but failed to score in 18 games and eventually returned to his parent club.

In 2000, Stolica signed a contract with Partizan. He, however, failed to make an impact with the Crno-beli and returned to Zemun the following year. By the end of the 2001–02 season, Stolica became the league's second-highest scorer with 19 goals.

In the 2003 winter transfer window, Stolica was transferred to Ukrainian club Metalurh Donetsk. He managed to play only 20 league games over the next two years, before returning to his homeland and joining OFK Beograd.

Between 2005 and 2008, Stolica spent three seasons in Belgium. He played for Sint-Truidense and Mons, scoring 20 goals combined. He subsequently had two unassuming spells in Greece and Montenegro.

In March 2006, while at Sint-Truidense, Stolica and two other players were questioned by the police as part of an investigation into match-fixing.

On 30 July 2010, Stolica signed with Major League Soccer club New England Revolution. He scored three times in the remainder of the season. In April 2011, Stolica was loaned to USL Pro team FC New York.

International career
At international level, Stolica was capped for FR Yugoslavia U21, making three appearances during the qualifications for the 2000 UEFA European Under-21 Championship.

Managerial career
In November 2016, Stolica was appointed as manager of Serbian SuperLiga club Voždovac. He resigned from his position in December 2017, only to take over as manager of Vojvodina later that month.

In October 2019, Stolica was named as manager of the Serbia under-21s, taking over the team from Nenad Milovanović after poor start to the qualifications for the 2021 UEFA European Under-21 Championship.

Managerial statistics
Updated 4 August 2022

Notes

References

External links
 
 
 
 

1978 births
Living people
People from Zemun
Footballers from Belgrade
Serbia and Montenegro footballers
Serbian footballers
Association football forwards
Serbia and Montenegro under-21 international footballers
FK Zemun players
UE Lleida players
FK Partizan players
FC Metalurh Donetsk players
OFK Beograd players
Sint-Truidense V.V. players
R.A.E.C. Mons players
OFI Crete F.C. players
FK Budućnost Podgorica players
New England Revolution players
F.C. New York players
First League of Serbia and Montenegro players
Segunda División players
Ukrainian Premier League players
Belgian Pro League players
Super League Greece players
Montenegrin First League players
Major League Soccer players
Serbia and Montenegro expatriate footballers
Serbian expatriate footballers
Expatriate footballers in Spain
Expatriate footballers in Ukraine
Expatriate footballers in Belgium
Expatriate footballers in Greece
Expatriate footballers in Montenegro
Expatriate soccer players in the United States
Serbia and Montenegro expatriate sportspeople in Spain
Serbia and Montenegro expatriate sportspeople in Ukraine
Serbia and Montenegro expatriate sportspeople in Belgium
Serbian expatriate sportspeople in Belgium
Serbian expatriate sportspeople in Greece
Serbian expatriate sportspeople in Montenegro
Serbian expatriate sportspeople in the United States
Serbian football managers
FK Partizan non-playing staff
FK Voždovac managers
FK Vojvodina managers
NK Olimpija Ljubljana (2005) managers
Serbia national under-21 football team managers
Serbia national football team managers
Serbian SuperLiga managers
Serbian expatriate football managers
Expatriate football managers in Slovenia
Serbian expatriate sportspeople in Slovenia